In geometry, a generalized circle, also referred to as a "cline" or "circline", is a straight line or a circle. The concept is mainly used in inversive geometry, because straight lines and circles have very similar properties in that geometry and are best treated together.

Inversive plane geometry is formulated on the plane extended by one point at infinity. A straight line is then thought of as one of the circles that passes through the asymptotic point at infinity. 
The fundamental transformations in inversive geometry, the inversions, have the property that they map generalized circles to generalized circles. Möbius transformations, which are compositions of inversions, inherit that property. These transformations do not necessarily map lines to lines and circles to circles: they can mix the two. 

Inversions come in two kinds: inversions at circles and reflections at lines. Since the two have very similar properties, we combine them and talk about inversions at generalized circles.

Given any three distinct points in the extended plane, there exists precisely one generalized circle that passes through the three points.
 
The extended plane can be identified with the sphere using a stereographic projection. The point at infinity then becomes an ordinary point on the sphere, and all generalized circles become circles on the sphere.

Equation in the extended complex plane
The extended plane of inversive geometry can be identified with the extended complex plane, so that equations of complex numbers can be used to describe lines, circles and inversions.

A circle Γ is the set of points z  in a plane that lie at radius r  from a center point γ. 

Using the complex plane, we can treat γ as a complex number and circle Γ as a set of complex numbers.

Using the property that a complex number multiplied by its conjugate gives us the square of the modulus of the number, and that its modulus is its Euclidean distance from the origin, we can express the equation for Γ as follows:

We can multiply this by a real constant A to get an equation of the form

where A and D are real, and B and C are complex conjugates. Reversing the steps, we see that in order for this to be a circle, the radius squared must be equal to BC/A2 − D/A > 0. So the above equation defines a generalized circle whenever AD < BC. Note that when A is zero, this equation defines a straight line.

The transformation w = 1/z
It is now easy to see that the transformation w = 1/z maps generalized circles to generalized circles:

We see that the lines through the origin (A = D = 0) are mapped to the lines through the origin, the lines not passing through the origin (A = 0; D ≠ 0) to circles passing through  the origin, circles passing through the origin (A ≠ 0; D = 0) to the lines not passing through the origin, and circles not passing through the origin (A ≠ 0; D ≠ 0) to circles not passing through the origin.

Representation by Hermitian matrices
The data defining the equation of a generalized circle 

can be usefully put into the form of an invertible hermitian matrix

Two such invertible hermitian matrices specify the same generalized circle if and only if they differ by a real multiple.

References 

 Hans Schwerdtfeger, Geometry of Complex Numbers, Courier Dover Publications, 1979
 Michael Henle, "Modern Geometry: Non-Euclidean, Projective, and Discrete", 2nd edition, Prentice Hall, 2001
 David W. Lyons (2021) Möbius Geometry from LibreTexts

Circles
Inversive geometry